Łęki Szlacheckie is a village in Piotrków County, Łódź Voivodeship, in central Poland. It is the seat of the gmina (administrative district) called Gmina Łęki Szlacheckie.

The village has a population of 450.

References

Villages in Piotrków County